Nikolay Harizanov (Bulgarian Cyrillic: Николай Харизанов; born 14 June 1983) is a Bulgarian footballer who currently plays as a defender for FC Eurocollege.

Career
Nikolay Harizanov started his career in PFC Hebar Pazardzhik. After that played for FC Chepinets, Slavia Sofia, Vidima-Rakovski and Beroe Stara Zagora. He came to PFC Botev Plovdiv on a free transfer in early 2008.

Botev Plovdiv
Harizanov made his official debut for Botev in a match against Spartak Varna on 1 March 2008. He played for 90 minutes. The result of the match was 2:0 with win for Botev. In season 2008-09, Harizanov earned 17 appearances playing in the A PFG.

Sportist
On 31 July 2009 Harizanov terminated his contract with Botev Plovdiv and a few days later signed with Sportist Svoge for two years. He remained part of the Svoge squad until late October 2009.

References

Bulgarian footballers
1983 births
Living people
Association football defenders
First Professional Football League (Bulgaria) players
FC Hebar Pazardzhik players
PFC Slavia Sofia players
PFC Beroe Stara Zagora players
Botev Plovdiv players
FC Sportist Svoge players
PFC Minyor Pernik players
Sportspeople from Pazardzhik